Giorgi Gvelesiani (born 5 May 1991) is a Georgian professional footballer, who currently plays for Iranian club Persepolis as a centre back.

Club career

Dinamo Tbilisi 
Ending his contract with Dinamo Tbilisi in June 2016, Gvelesiani trained with Ukrainian team Volyn Lutsk soon after. However, his stint there proved transitory as registration problems prevented them from legally letting him play, resulting in him leaving the club in August.

Zob Ahan 

Early into summer 2017, the Iranian media spread rumors that a transfer to Persian Gulf Pro League outfit Zob Ahan was imminent for Gvelesiani; he eventually signed for them a few days later. Given a red card for his reckless actions on his debut, the Georgian defender settled well in to the club, forming a good relationship with his teammates and staff.

Nassaji Mazandaran 
On 28 July 2018, Gvelesiani joined Iranian club Nassaji Mazandaran on a one-year deal.

Sepahan 

On 12 June 2019, Gvelesiani joined Sepahan S.C. on a two-year deal.

Persepolis 

On 19 June 2022, Gvelesiani joined Persian Gulf Pro League side Persepolis on a new two-year deal. In December 2022, Gvelesiani gave Persepolis the lead in the 16th minute of Tehran derby against Esteghlal with a header in the box. In the second half, He once again scored with a header in the 89th minute.

He became the first defender in the history of capital derby to score two goals in one game. After his performance in the Tehran derby, he became more popular among Persepolis fans.

He also has become the first choice to score a penalty kick in his team, Persepolis. Even in the presence of the team's forwards, he would take penalties. Iranian media wrote about his ability to score penalties.

Among the foreign players in the history of Persepolis club, he is one of the foreign defenders with a significant number of goals. He has usually performed well in important matches for Persepolis, Especially against Esteghlal and Sepahan.

International career 
He was called up to the Georgia national football team for the first time in the 2015–16 season.

Style of play 
Gvelesiani has a good ability to score goals and helps the team when scoring becomes difficult for the forwards.

Personal life 
He has mentioned that his sleep time varies and sometimes he stays up late. He added: "I am not super professional and sometimes I sleep at 2 or 3, eat whatever I want and wake up whenever I want. I don't think football has anything to do with this. Football depends on your personality and that is the most important issue. I try to keep the middle; I am not a fully professional guy and I live a normal life. The secret of success is that I try to give 100% of my game on the field and even in training I always try to win; This is the secret of my personality".

Career statistics

Honours 
Dinamo Tbilisi
 Erovnuli Liga: 2012–13, 2013–14, 2015–16; runner-up: 2010–11
 David Kipiani Cup: 2012–13, 2013–14, 2014–15, 2015–16
 Georgian Super Cup: 2014–15, 2015–16
Zob Ahan
 Persian Gulf Pro League runner-up: 2017–18
Sepahan
 Persian Gulf Pro League runner-up: 2020–21

References

External links

 Volyn Lutsk Interview
 

Expatriate footballers from Georgia (country)
Footballers from Georgia (country)
Expatriate footballers in Iran
Expatriate sportspeople from Georgia (country) in Iran
Association football defenders
1991 births
Living people
Persian Gulf Pro League players
FC Dinamo Tbilisi players
Zob Ahan Esfahan F.C. players
Persepolis F.C. players
Footballers from Tbilisi
Erovnuli Liga players
Georgia (country) youth international footballers